Thalerhof may refer to:
Graz Airport
Thalerhof internment camp
Thalerhof U 12 planes